Sinclair is an unincorporated community in Preston County, West Virginia, United States, located at the intersection of Davis Hill Road and Sinclair Coalbank Road. The town is named after oil drilling in the area performed by Sinclair Oil Corp. The Sinclair United Methodist Church is also located in Sinclair, West Virginia.

See also
Unincorporated communities in West Virginia

References 

Unincorporated communities in West Virginia
Unincorporated communities in Preston County, West Virginia